The Wayne County Building is a monumental government structure located at 600 Randolph Street in Downtown Detroit, Michigan. It formerly contained the Wayne County administrative offices – now located in the Guardian Building at 500 Griswold Street – and its courthouse. As Wayne County Courthouse, it was listed on the National Register of Historic Places in 1975. When it was completed in 1902, it was regarded as "one of the most sumptuous buildings in Michigan".

Architecture
The building was designed by Detroit architects John and Arthur Scott. Constructed from 1897 to 1902, it may be one of the nation's finest surviving examples of Roman Baroque Revival architecture, with a blend of Beaux-Arts and some elements of the Neoclassical style.

The building stands 5 floors and was built using copper, granite, and stone. The exterior is profusely ornamented with sculpture; the interior is finished in a variety of woods, marbles, tiles, and mosaics. Built with buff Berea sandstone, the façade features a rusticated basement story and a balustrade between the third and fourth stories. At the main entrance, a broad flight of stairs leads up to a two-story Corinthian column portico. The structure boasts a tall, four-tiered, hipped roof central tower balanced by end pavilions. The courthouse tower was originally 227' 8½" tall; the copper dome and spire were redone in the 1960s, bringing its height to 247 feet.

The exterior architectural sculpture, including the Anthony Wayne pediment, was executed by Detroit sculptor Edward Wagner. The other sculptures, two quadrigas, Victory and Progress and four figures on the tower, Law, Commerce, Agriculture, and Mechanics, were sculpted by New York sculptor J. Massey Rhind, and made by Salem, Ohio resident William H. Mullins in 1903.

On the other end of Campus Martius was the old Detroit City Hall, and they adorned the landscape as 'bookends'.

A renovation was carried out in 1987 by Quinn Evans Architects and Smith, Hinchman & Grylls Associates.

Recent news
On July 18, 2007, Wayne County Executive Robert Ficano announced Wayne County had entered into an agreement to purchase the Guardian Building to relocate its offices from the Wayne County Building. This purchase would commence when the county's lease on their current home expires in 2008 and end a difficult tenant-landlord relationship between the owners and the County. The Detroit Free Press print edition on July 21, 2007, carried a front-page article about the current landlord offering a reduced rate for the county to remain.

In July 2014, the Wayne County Commission approved the sale of the building along with a county-owned parking lot at 400 E. Fort Street to a New York investment group for $13.4 million. The building is expected to be renovated for single tenant occupancy.

Gallery

References

Further reading
Farbman, Suzy and James P. Gallagher (1989). The Renaissance of the Wayne County Building, Smith Hinchman & Grylls, Inc, The old Wayne County Building Limited Partnership and Walbridge Aldinger Company, Detroit, Michigan.
Ferry, W. Hawkins (1968). The Buildings of Detroit: A History, Wayne State University Press.
Gibson, Arthur Hopkin (1975). Artists of Early Michigan: A Biographical Dictionary of Artists Native to or Active in Michigan, 1701–1900, Wayne State University Press.
Kvaran & Lockely, A Guide to the Architectural Sculpture in America, unpublished manuscript.

Nawrocki, Dennis Alan and Thomas J. Holleman (1980). Art in Detroit Public Places, Wayne State University Press.

External links

Wayne County Courthouse

Historic images from Detroit Public Library

Buildings and structures in Detroit
County government buildings in Michigan
Downtown Detroit
Government buildings completed in 1902
Government buildings on the National Register of Historic Places in Michigan
Michigan State Historic Sites in Wayne County, Michigan
National Historic Landmarks in Metro Detroit
National Register of Historic Places in Detroit
1902 establishments in Michigan
1902 sculptures
Outdoor sculptures in Michigan
Baroque Revival architecture in the United States
Beaux-Arts architecture in Michigan
Neoclassical architecture in Michigan
County courthouses in Michigan